Béla Perényi (October 20, 1953 – November 13, 1988) was a Hungarian chess international master known for his work in opening theory. Two major lines in the Najdorf Sicilian are named after him. He died in a car crash in 1988, while on the way to visit his fiancée, Ildikó Mádl.

Perenyi attack
The "Perenyi attack" (1. e4 c5 2. Nf3 d6 3. d4 cxd4 4. Nxd4 Nf6 5. Nc3 a6 6. Be3 e6 7. g4!?) is a line in the Najdorf Sicilian named after Perenyi, who invented it. It is a very sharp line that involves White sacrificing a knight in the main line. It has since been used multiple times by other strong Hungarian masters, including Judit Polgar and Peter Leko.

References

External links

1953 births
1988 deaths
Road incident deaths in Hungary
Hungarian chess players
Chess International Masters
20th-century chess players